Dato' Haji Suhaimi Kamaruddin is a Malaysian politician and a lawyer by profession. He was a former chief of UMNO Youth and a former Deputy Minister in the federal government. He is a member of the United Malays National Organisation (UMNO), the largest political party in the former ruling Barisan Nasional (BN) coalition. He was the Member of Parliament for Sepang in Selangor for three terms from 1974 to 1986 representing BN.

He was also the former president of the Gerakan Belia 4B Malaysia youth association.

Early life and career
Suhaimi was born as the son of former Menteri Besar of Terrenganu, Dato' Perdana Menteri Di Raja Dato' Seri Setia Raja Kamaruddin Idris. After attending a local primary school, he later attended the Malay College Kuala Kangsar for his secondary education. He went on to gain an LL.B. fromrom the University of Birmingham in Law, and obtained his Bar.

His entry into politics brought with him much acclaim as a politician, and he quickly rose up the ranks of UMNO to gain leadership of the UMNO Youth movement. His views were heavily pro-Malay, and he suggested many times in parliament for the NEP target of a 30% stake of the economic action be raised to 40%-50% to benefit the Malays. While he professed that his intentions were to support the  Malays who were generally of a more impoverished background, his views were misconstrued as ultra-nationalism and his success was partially, if not intentionally, due to fulminating feelings regarding the Malay identity. In 1982, Suhaimi lost the leadership of UMNO Youth after the fledgling politician Anwar Ibrahim wrested the control of the movement from him by a slim 10-vote majority in a bitterly fought contest. Anwar received 183, compared to Suhaimi's 173, with Hang Tuah Arshad receiving only 3 votes. In 1984, the votes were more in Anwar's favour, 226 as opposed to Suhaimi's 137. However, seeing him as a very real threat to his political career, Anwar removed Suhaimi from the movement despite the ongoing media vilification of Anwar's motivations and accusations that Anwar participated in 'politik wang' (money politics).

Despite this set-back, Suhaimi still managed to become the Deputy Minister of Education. In 1981, he proposed the integration of the education system (at the time, split into national schools, Chinese schools and Tamil schools) so that the Malay, Chinese and Indian children would learn to integrate, resulting in racial harmony. He was lambasted for such a suggestion by Lim Kit Siang of the Democratic Action Party (DAP), who denouncing such a view as "extremist and chauvinistic." Suhaimi defended his views, maintaining that racial integration was more important than catering schools to a particular race, forewarning everyone of racial polarisation in the future. He was rebuked, and the Sedition Act was cited as a threat were he to continue with such a proposal.

Later political career
In 1987, Tengku Razaleigh Hamzah challenged the then Prime Minister Dr. Mahathir Mohamad. In the election, Dr. Mahathir managed to retain his position. However, UMNO was split into two separate entities as Tengku Razaleigh was left unsatisfied with the result. He left the party and went on his own path, founding a new political party called Parti Melayu Semangat 46 in 1989. The number 46 refers to the year UMNO was founded. Suhaimi became the secretary-general of the party, along with other big political names from the media-labelled Team B such as Datuk Rais Yatim, Datuk Mohd Radzi Sheikh Ahmad, Datuk Zainal Abidin Zin, Datuk Manan Othman, Datuk Ibrahim Ali, Datin Paduka Rahmah Othman and Marina Yusof, defected to Semangat 46. However, other key members of Team B notably Tun Musa Hitam, Datuk Shahrir Samad and former Prime Minister Datuk Seri Abdullah Ahmad Badawi decided to remain in Umno, but silently supported Semangat 46 from behind to avoid the media's attention.

Seven years later, Tengku Razaleigh disbanded Semangat 46 and rejoined UMNO, forcing Suhaimi and his other political companions to return to UMNO or retire permanently from politics. Suhaimi rejoined UMNO and he remains active in politics to this day.

Recent activity 
In May 2008, German company GUNT, represented by Datuk Suhaimi Kamaruddin, Marisa Regina Mohd Aris Rizal and Saidatun Nasihah, won against the Cheras firm, MS Instruments Sdn Bhd. The case involved the latter supplying the Education Ministry with imitation products under the guise of the genuine German article.

See also

 Sepang (federal constituency)

Notes and references

Year of birth missing (living people)
Living people
Malaysian people of Malay descent
Malaysian Muslims

20th-century Malaysian lawyers

United Malays National Organisation politicians
Parti Melayu Semangat 46 politicians
Alumni of the University of Birmingham
Members of the Dewan Rakyat
Members of the Selangor State Legislative Assembly
Members of Lincoln's Inn